The 21st Lux Style Awards were held on 24 November 2022 in Lahore, Pakistan.

Winners and nominees 
The nominations were announced on 23 November 2022.

Film

Television

Music

Fashion

Honorary

References

External link
 

Lux Style Awards
Lahore